Villiers may refer to:

Places

France
 Villiers, Indre, in the Indre département
 Villiers, Vienne, in the Vienne département
 Villiers-Adam, in the Val-d'Oise département
 Villiers-au-Bouin, in the Indre-et-Loire département
 Villiers-aux-Corneilles, in the Marne département
 Villiers-Charlemagne, in the Mayenne département
 Villiers-Couture, in the Charente-Maritime département
 Villiers-en-Bière, in the Seine-et-Marne département
 Villiers-en-Bois, in the Deux-Sèvres département
 Villiers-en-Désœuvre, in the Eure département
 Villiers-en-Lieu, in the Haute-Marne département
 Villiers-en-Morvan, in the Côte-d'Or département
 Villiers-en-Plaine, in the Deux-Sèvres département
 Villiers-Fossard, in the Manche département
 Villiers-Herbisse, in the Aube département
 Villiers-le-Bâcle, in the Essonne département
 Villiers-le-Bel, in the Val-d'Oise département
 Villiers-le-Bois, in the Aube département
 Villiers-le-Duc, in the Côte-d'Or département
 Villiers-le-Mahieu, in the Yvelines département
 Villiers-le-Morhier, in the Eure-et-Loir département
 Villiers-le-Pré, in the Manche département
 Villiers-le-Roux, in the Charente département
 Villiers-lès-Aprey, in the Haute-Marne département
 Villiers-le-Sec, Calvados, in the Calvados département
 Villiers-le-Sec, Haute-Marne, in the Haute-Marne département
 Villiers-le-Sec, Nièvre, in the Nièvre département
 Villiers-le-Sec, Val-d'Oise, in the Val-d'Oise département
 Villiers-les-Hauts, in the Yonne département
 Villiers-Louis, in the Yonne département
 Villiers-Saint-Benoît, in the Yonne département
 Villiers-Saint-Denis, in the Aisne département
 Villiers-Saint-Frédéric, in the Yvelines département
 Villiers-Saint-Georges, in the Seine-et-Marne département
 Villiers-Saint-Orien, in the Eure-et-Loir département
 Villiers-sous-Grez, in the Seine-et-Marne département
 Villiers-sous-Mortagne, in the Orne département
 Villiers-sous-Praslin, in the Aube département
 Villiers-sur-Chizé, in the Deux-Sèvres département
 Villiers-sur-Loir, in the Loir-et-Cher département
 Villiers-sur-Marne, in the Val-de-Marne département
 Villiers-sur-Morin, in the Seine-et-Marne département
 Villiers-sur-Orge, in the Essonne département
 Villiers-sur-Seine, in the Seine-et-Marne département
 Villiers-sur-Suize, in the Haute-Marne département
 Villiers-sur-Tholon, in the Yonne département
 Villiers-sur-Yonne, in the Nièvre département
 Villiers-Vineux, in the Yonne département
 Villiers (Paris Metro), a station of the Paris Métro (lines 2 and 3)

Elsewhere
 Villiers Island, an artificial island at the north-west corner of Toronto's Port Lands
 Villiers, Ontario, Canada, a small settlement near Peterborough
 Villiers, Free State, South Africa
 Villiers, Switzerland, in the Val-de-Ruz district of the canton of Neuchâtel

People
 Villiers family, British noble family
 Villiers baronets, in the Baronetage of England
 Abraham de Villiers, French Huguenot refugee in South Africa 
 AB de Villiers (born 1984), South African cricketer
 Alan Villiers (1903–1982), Australian author, adventurer, photographer and mariner
 Amherst Villiers (1900-1991), English automotive, aeronautical and astronautic engineer and portrait painter
 André Villiers (born 1954), French politician
 André-Jean-François-Marie Brochant de Villiers (1772–1840), French mineralogist and geologist
 Auguste Villiers de l'Isle-Adam (1838–1889), French symbolist writer
 Barbara Villiers, later Barbara Palmer, 1st Duchess of Cleveland (1640–1709), English courtesan
 Charles Villiers (disambiguation)
 Constance Villiers-Stuart (1877-1966), English author and water-colour painter
 Édouard de Villiers du Terrage (1780–1855), French engineer
 Edward Villiers (disambiguation)
 Elizabeth Villiers, later Elizabeth Hamilton, Countess of Orkney (1657–1733), English courtier
 Fanie de Villiers (born 1964), South African cricketer
 Frances Villiers, Countess of Jersey (1753–1821), English mistress of the Prince Regent
 Francis Child Villiers (1819–1862), British politician
 Francis Hyde Villiers (1852–1925), British civil servant and diplomat
 François Villiers (1920–2009), French film director
 François Hüet Villiers (1772–1813), French-born artist resident in London
 Frederic Villiers (1851–1922), British war artist and war correspondent
 Sir George Villiers (of Brokesby) (c.1544–1606), High Sheriff of Leicestershire, England, and Member of Parliament
 George Villiers (disambiguation)
 Gérard de Villiers (1929–2013), French writer, journalist and publisher
 Giniel de Villiers (born 1972), South African racing and rally driver
 Jacques Villiers (1924–2012), French aerospace engineer and public servant
 James Villiers (1933–1998), British actor
 Jean de Villiers (Grand Master) of the Knights Hospitaller in the 13th century
 Jean de Villiers (born 1981), South African rugby union footballer
 John Villers (born 1485/86), English politician
 Katherine Villiers, Duchess of Buckingham (died 1649)
 Sieur Louis Coulon de Villiers (1710–1757), French Canadian military officer
 Philippe de Villiers (born 1949), French politician
 Pieter de Villiers (disambiguation)
 Priscilla de Villiers, Canadian activist
 Sarah Villiers, Countess of Jersey (1785–1867)
 Theresa Villiers (born 1968), British politician
 Victor Child Villiers, 7th Earl of Jersey (1845–1915), British banker, politician and colonial administrator
 William Villiers (disambiguation)

Fictional characters
 Diana Villiers, a fictional character in the Aubrey-Maturin series by Patrick O'Brian
 Snow Villiers is a playable character in Square Enix's Final Fantasy XIII
 A character in the 1596 play Edward III, partly written by William Shakespeare
 A character in the James Bond film Casino Royale
 Anthony Villiers, the protagonist of a science-fiction series by Alexei Panshin
 A character in Arthur Machen's novella The Great God Pan
 A character in The Bourne Identity series by Robert Ludlum Bourne

Other
 Battle of Villiers, a 1870 battle during the Franco-Prussian war
 Villiers Engineering, a manufacturer of bicycle and motorcycle parts
 Villiers School, in Limerick, Ireland

See also
 De Villiers, a surname
 Villers (disambiguation)